The Calawah River is a  tributary of the Bogachiel River in Clallam County in the U.S. state of Washington, on its Olympic Peninsula. Its two major tributaries are the South and North Forks Calawah River. The river drains an unpopulated portion of the low foothills of the Olympic Mountains; its entire watershed consists of virgin forest.

The river's name comes from the Quileute word qàló?wa:, meaning "in between", or "middle river".

See also

List of rivers of Washington
Quillayute River
Sol Duc River

References

Rivers of Washington (state)
Rivers of Clallam County, Washington
Washington placenames of Native American origin